St Mary's Church, Undy is located in the village of Undy, in Monmouthshire, Wales.

History
The church dates to around the twelfth century. The pointed chancel is from the following century, and was extended at a later (unclear) date. In 1880, the church underwent a major restoration by John Prichard, its north nave window dating from this period, though many of the other windows are considerably older. At this time, a small tower that stood at the centre of the structure was removed and replaced with a (comparatively) large bell turret. The names of the churchwardens in service in 1790 are carved on the porch. A second restoration occurred in 2001.

Organisation
The church is part of the Rectorial Benefice of Magor, in the deanery of Netherwent.

Listing
The church has been a Grade II listed building since 1955.

References

Grade II listed churches in Monmouthshire
Church in Wales church buildings
12th-century church buildings in Wales